The Quaker Consortium is an arrangement among three liberal arts colleges, Bryn Mawr College, Haverford College, and Swarthmore College, and one research university, the University of Pennsylvania, all located in the greater Philadelphia area. The arrangement allows for their students to enroll in courses at the other schools of the Consortium.

The name stems from the historic influence of Quakers in the Philadelphia region and in the founding and administration of the Consortium's member schools.

The three liberal arts colleges, members of the Tri-College Consortium, facilitate transportation among their respective campuses with free shuttle services. No such service is offered between the liberal arts colleges and Penn. Students wishing to get to Penn must drive or take the SEPTA Paoli/Thorndale Line or Media/Wawa Line trains to Philadelphia. Haverford and Bryn Mawr students can also take the Norristown High Speed Line to 69th Street Transportation Center in Upper Darby where they transfer to SEPTA's Market–Frankford Line to reach Penn.  Some programs at the liberal arts colleges subsidize these SEPTA fares.

Historically, students from the three liberal arts colleges have taken advantage of the consortium (for Penn's vast curricular offerings) much more frequently than Penn undergraduates. In 2006, for example, around 150 Bryn Mawr College students took classes at Penn, while only 5 Penn students took classes at the three liberal arts colleges.

External links
Information on Quaker Consortium for Penn students
Information on "Tri-Co" transportation
Shared course directory for Haverford, Bryn Mawr, and Swarthmore
Course directory for Penn

References 

 
Quaker universities and colleges